André Jael Curbelo Rodríguez (born October 13, 2001) is a Puerto Rican college basketball player for the St. John's Red Storm of the Big East Conference. He previously played for the Illinois Fighting Illini. Curbelo represents the Puerto Rican national team in international tournaments.

High school career
Curbelo grew up in Vega Baja, Puerto Rico and started playing basketball at age four. He moved to the New York area  when he was 13 years old. Curbelo decided to attend Long Island Lutheran Middle and High School in Brookville, New York after being suggested by a family friend. He spoke little English and struggled academically as a freshman, before gradually adjusting and improving his grades. In his junior season, Curbelo averaged 15.5 points, eight rebounds, nine assists and four steals per game and was named Newsday All-Long Island Player of the Year. He led Long Island Lutheran to the Class AA title at the New York State Federation Tournament of Champions in 2019, his school's first-ever Class AA Federation championship after their seven previous Federation championships in classes A, B and C. In April 2019, Curbelo played for the World Select Team at the Nike Hoop Summit in Portland, Oregon.

Recruiting
Curbelo was considered a four-star recruit, according to major recruiting services. On November 1, 2019, he committed to playing college basketball for Illinois over offers from Oregon, Florida, Kansas and Louisville, among others. Curbelo was recruited to Illinois by assistant coach Orlando Antigua.

College career
As a freshman, Curbelo averaged 9.1 points, 4.2 assists and four rebounds per game. He was named Big Ten Sixth Man of the Year. He missed the sophomore season opener against Jackson State due to a concussion. On November 25, 2021, Curbelo played limited minutes against Kansas State and missed several games due to continued head trauma. On March 28, 2022 Curbelo announced that he had decided to leave Illinois and enter his name into the transfer portal. On April 15, 2022, Curbelo announced that he had committed to St. John's.

National team career
In 2016, Curbelo won a gold medal with Puerto Rico at the Centrobasket Under-15 Championship in Patillas, Puerto Rico after averaging 16.5 points, seven rebounds and 6.5 assists per game. At the 2017 FIBA Under-16 Americas Championship in Formosa, Argentina, he averaged a tournament-leading 21.8 points, seven rebounds, 3.2 assists and 3.5 steals per game and won a bronze medal. Curbelo competed at the 2018 FIBA Under-17 World Cup in Argentina, where he averaged 13.6 points, 5.6 rebounds and a tournament-high 5.9 assists per game and led his team to another bronze medal. He averaged 11.1 points and 5.6 assists per game at the 2019 FIBA Under-19 World Cup in Heraklion, Greece as Puerto Rico finished in sixth place.

Career statistics

College

|-
| style="text-align:left;"| 2020–21
| style="text-align:left;"| Illinois
| 31 || 0 || 21.5 || .498 || .161 || .728 || 4.0 || 4.2 || .9 || .1 || 9.1
|-
| style="text-align:left;"| 2021–22
| style="text-align:left;"| Illinois
| 19 || 4 || 19.3 || .329 || .176 || .745 || 3.1 || 3.2 || .7 || .1 || 7.5
|-
| style="text-align:left;"| 2022–23
| style="text-align:left;"| St. John's
| 26 || 16 || 27.3 || .424 || .294 || .705 || 2.8 || 4.3 || 2.0 || .2 || 9.6
|- class="sortbottom"
| style="text-align:center;" colspan="2"| Career
| 76 || 20 || 23.0 || .427 || .212 || .727 || 3.4 || 4.0 || 1.2 || .1 || 8.9

Personal life
Curbelo's father, Joel, played professional basketball for 18 years and represented Puerto Rico at the 1996 Summer Olympics. His mother, Joann Rodríguez, played for the Puerto Rico women's national handball team. Curbelo's aunt played basketball for the Puerto Rico women's national team.

References

External links
Illinois Fighting Illini bio

2001 births
Living people
Illinois Fighting Illini men's basketball players
Puerto Rican men's basketball players
People from Vega Baja, Puerto Rico
Point guards